Macasinia is a genus of moths belonging to the subfamily Tortricinae of the family Tortricidae.

Species
Macasinia chorisma Razowski & J. W. Brown, 2004
Macasinia furcata Razowski & Pelz, 2001
Macasinia minifurcata Razowski & Becker, 2002
Macasinia mirabilana Razowski & Becker, 2002
Macasinia vilhena Razowski & Becker, 2007

See also
List of Tortricidae genera

References

 , 2005: World Catalogue of Insects volume 5 Tortricidae.
 , 2011: Diagnoses and remarks on genera of Tortricidae, 2: Cochylini (Lepidoptera: Tortricidae). SHILAP Revista de Lepidopterología 39 (156): 397–414.
 , 2002: Systematic and faunistic data on Neotropical Cochylini (Lepidoptera: Tortricidae), with descriptions of new species. Part.1. Acta zool. cracov. 45B: 287–316. Full article: .
 , 2004: New species and new combinations in Neotropical Euliini (Lepidoptera: Tortricidae). SHILAP Revista de Lepidopterologica 32 (128): 321–337. Full article: .
 , 2001: Tortricidae (Lepidoptera) collected in Ecuador in the years 1996–1999: Tortricini and Cochylini. Nachrichten des Entomologischen Vereins Aploo NF 22 (1): 17–28.

External links
Tortricid.net

Cochylini
Tortricidae genera
Taxa named by Józef Razowski